La Choca ("The Bump") is a 1974 Mexican drama film directed by Emilio Fernández and starring Pilar Pellicer. It won the Ariel Award for Best Picture at the 17th Ariel Awards in 1975.

Plot summary
In the jungle of Guatemala, La Choca (Pilar Pellicer) is a rude woman trying to resist everything, however, she succumbs in front of the carnal desire for El Guacho (Gregorio Casal), a bandit who killed her husband and attacked her family. Audias (Salvador Sánchez) unsuccessfully tries to rape Flor (Mercedes Carreño), Choca's sister in law. In the following days Flor and El Guacho get involved in a sexual relationship which infuriates Choca, who in retaliation kills Flor, El Guacho and Audias. The film closes with a scene where Choca leaves town with her son in search for a better education for him.

Cast
 Pilar Pellicer as La Choca
 Gregorio Casal as El Guacho
 Juanito Guerra Arellano as Martincito
 Mercedes Carreño as Flor
 Armando Silvestre as Fabiel
 Salvador Sánchez as Audias
 Chano Urueta as Don Pomposo

Accolades

References

External links 
 

1974 films
Best Picture Ariel Award winners
1970s Spanish-language films
1974 drama films
Films directed by Emilio Fernández
Mexican drama films
1970s Mexican films